Mount Warren  may refer to one of the following:

Antarctica 

 Mount Warren (Antarctica) on Sentinel Range
 Mount Warren (Warren Range) at Warren Range

Australia 

 Mount Warren (Queensland)
Mount Warren Park, Queensland, a suburb in Logan City

Canada 

Mount Warren (Alberta)

United States 

Mount Warren (Arizona)
Mount Warren (California)
Mount Warren (Colorado)
Mount Warren (New York)
Mount Warren (Wyoming)